Austin McGiffert Wright (1922 – April 23, 2003) was an American novelist, literary critic and professor emeritus of English at the University of Cincinnati.

Life and career
Wright was born in Yonkers, New York. He grew up in Hastings-on-Hudson, New York, the son of the geographer John Kirtland Wright and Katharine McGiffert Wright, and namesake of his uncle, Austin Tappan Wright, writer of the utopian novel, Islandia. His paternal grandparents were classical scholar John Henry Wright and novelist Mary Tappan Wright. He graduated from Harvard University in 1943. He served in the Army (1943–1946). He graduated from the University of Chicago, with a master's degree in 1948, and a Ph.D. in 1959.

He married Sara Hull Wright, in 1950.  They had three children: Joanna Wright (died 2000), Katharine Wright of Berkeley, CA, and Margaret Wright, and two granddaughters, Madeline Giscombe and Elizabeth Perkins.

Austin Wright was a professor in the English Department at the University of Cincinnati for almost forty years.  

Wright died in 2003 in Cincinnati. When he died, he had realized certain proceeds from the sale of movie rights to his book Tony and Susan, but he had no reason to believe that a film would actually be made. Tony and Susan was re-issued, and became a major film, Nocturnal Animals (2016).

Awards
 1985 Whiting Award

Works

Novels
 Camden's Eyes Doubleday, 1969
 
 
 
    (review )

Non-fiction
 The American short story in the twenties, University of Chicago Press, 1961

References

External links
Profile at The Whiting Foundation

1922 births
2003 deaths
20th-century American novelists
American male novelists
Harvard University alumni
University of Chicago alumni
University of Cincinnati faculty
United States Army personnel of World War II
20th-century American male writers
Novelists from Ohio